Ebrahim Ghasempour (born 11 September 1957) is an Iranian association football coach and retired player who in 2013 managed Sanat Naft in Azadegan League.

Early life
Ghasempour was born on 11 September 1957 in Abadan, Iran and began his career by playing in the youth team of Sanat Naft in 1972. He joined the senior team in 1974 after winning the 1974 AFC Youth Championship.

Playing career
After playing for Sanat Naft for three years, he left the club in 1976 and joined Shahbaz reaching the third place in the Iranian league in 1976–77 with that club as one of the key players. He signed a two-year contract with Pas in 1978. He played for different clubs in Iranian, Emirati, Qatari and Egyptian leagues for 16 years. He returned to Pas in 1994 and retired in 1996.

International career
Ghasempour was invited to the Iran national football team and made 31 appearances for the Iran national football team from 1975 to 1978 and was a participant at the 1978 FIFA World Cup. He was a member of the Iranian team winning the Asia Cup 1976 in Tehran, and reached the quarterfinals of the Olympic Tournament in Montreal in 1976.

Coaching career
In 1994, Ghasempour returned to Pas as a player-manager and managed the team until 1995. After he retired from playing, he was appointed as the head coach of B team of Pas club and was selected again as the manager of Pas in 1997 but resigned after six months to become the manager of Iran national under-23 football team. He was sacked in 1999. Two months after, he returned again as the head coach of Pas. He was appointed as the manager of Sanat Naft in July 2001 and was managing the team until February 2002. Bargh Shiraz signed a contract with Ghasempour in February 2002 and he stayed there till December 2002. He became the head coach of United Arab Emirates club, Hatta Club, in January 2006. He resigned in April 2007 and was appointed as the head coach of Sanat Naft in July 2007. After bad results, Ghasempour was sacked in March 2008. In June 2008, he was appointed as the head coach of Homa and resigned the same year. He returned to Hatta in November 2008 but resigned and became the head coach of Emirates Club. He left the club over disagreements with the club's chairman. He was appointed as the head coach of Iran Pro League side Damash Gilan on 20 September 2011 replaced Mehdi Dinvarzadeh but he resigned on 31 December 2011 after just five months in charge. He was appointed as Mes Kerman's new head coach on 15 February 2012, signing a contract until the end of season. He began his career in Mes with a 1–1 draw with Persepolis. After some good results with the team that saved the club from relegation, his contract was extended for one more season but he was sacked on 27 December 2012. He was named as newly relegated Sanat Naft on 12 June 2013. After his failure in promoting back the team to the first division, he was sacked by the club.

Statistics

References

1957 births
Living people
Iranian footballers
Iranian football managers
Iranian expatriate footballers
Pas players
Sanat Naft Abadan F.C. players
Shahin FC players
1976 AFC Asian Cup players
1978 FIFA World Cup players
AFC Asian Cup-winning players
Iran international footballers
Al-Nasr SC (Dubai) players
Olympic footballers of Iran
Footballers at the 1976 Summer Olympics
Expatriate footballers in Egypt
Al Masry SC players
Al Sadd SC players
Al-Arabi SC (Qatar) players
Al-Rayyan SC players
Damash Gilan managers
Emirates Club managers
UAE Pro League players
Association football midfielders
Qatar Stars League players
Sanat Naft Abadan F.C. managers
Bargh Shiraz F.C. managers